Darby Lloyd Rains (born in 1948) is a former adult film performer who was prolific during the 1970s. She is a member of the XRCO Hall of Fame. She appeared uncredited as a stripper in the 1971 film The French Connection.

Partial filmography
This Film Is All About ... (1970)
Rosebud (1972)
Lovelace Meets Miss Jones (1973)
Memories Within Miss Aggie (1974)
Angel Number 9 (1974)
Private Afternoons Of Pamela Mann (1975)
Naked Came the Stranger (1975)
Every Inch A Lady (1975)
Practice Makes Perfect (1976)
French Kiss (1979)

References

External links
 
 
 Excalibur Films profile

American pornographic film actresses
1948 births
Living people
21st-century American women